Robert Anthony Rucho (born December 8, 1948), a dentist from Matthews, North Carolina, was a  Republican member of the North Carolina General Assembly representing the state's thirty-ninth Senate district, including parts of Mecklenburg County.
Rucho served as co-chairman of the Senate Finance Committee until his abrupt resignation in June 2013 in a dispute with Senate President Pro Tempore Phil Berger over tax reform policy. Berger never accepted the resignation and the next month, Rucho resumed his chairmanship.

Views on the Affordable Care Act 
 
Rucho gained much criticism, including from within his own party, after he tweeted "Justice Robert's pen & Obamacare has done more damage to the USA then [sic] the swords of the Nazis, Soviets & terrorists combined" on December 15, 2013.

References

External links
News & Observer: Rucho retakes legislative seat

|-

|-

1948 births
Living people
21st-century American politicians
Republican Party North Carolina state senators
Northeastern University alumni
People from Matthews, North Carolina
People from Raleigh, North Carolina
Politicians from Worcester, Massachusetts
University of North Carolina at Charlotte alumni